Martina Hingis and Sania Mirza were the defending champions, but chose not to participate together. Hingis played alongside CoCo Vandeweghe, but lost in the second round to Ashleigh Barty and Casey Dellacqua. Mirza teamed up with Barbora Strýcová, but lost in the third round to Eri Hozumi and Miyu Kato.

Bethanie Mattek-Sands and Lucie Šafářová won the title, defeating Andrea Hlaváčková and Peng Shuai in the final, 6–7(4–7), 6–3, 6–3.

Seeds

Draw

Finals

Top half

Section 1

Section 2

Bottom half

Section 3

Section 4

External links
Women's doubles drawsheet on ausopen.com
 2017 Australian Open – Women's draws and results at the International Tennis Federation

Women's Doubles
2017
2017 in Australian women's sport